Commentaire is a French quarterly magazine, created in 1978 by Raymond Aron and Jean-Claude Casanova.

Aron's previous journal venture, started in 1970 and titled Contrepoint, had been terminated in 1976 following disagreements among its founders and its owner Patrick Devedjian. The journal's motto, a quote from Pericles, was suggested by Papaioannou: Il n’y a pas de bonheur sans liberté, ni de liberté sans vaillance ("there can be neither happiness without liberty, nor liberty without courage"). Pierre Manent was the author of a manifesto explaining the journal's purpose in the first issue.

Among the journal's avowedly liberal inspirations, Casanova cited Montesquieu, Benjamin Constant, Alexis de Tocqueville, Élie Halévy, and Aron himself.

The journal relies largely on volunteer work and a small administrative staff. In 2008, it printed 6,000 copies and had 3,800 subscribers, the rest beingly sold in bookstores and newsshops.

A specific feature is the abundance of selected quotes in each of the journal's issues. A section titled sans commentaire ("no comment") includes involuntary comical quotes, often from political leaders or ideological commentators.

In 2017, Commentaire made all its past published articles available online. Like its center-left peer Esprit, it is self-published and not dependent on a large publishing house.

Affiliates

As of early 2021, Commentaire's website mentioned two circles of affiliates (including past and deceased ones):
 Editorial Committee (Comité de rédaction): Cédric Argenton, Guillaume Barrera, Karol Beffa, Jacques Bille, Dominique Bocquet, Michel Bourdeau, Christopher Caldwell, Gwendal Châton, Laurent Cohen-Tanugi, Benedetta Craveri, Jean-Marc Daniel, Michel Duclos, Bruno Durieux, Vincent Feré, Louis de Fouchécour, Jean Gatty, François Gorand, Donatien Grau, Sylviane Guillaumont, Patrick Guillaumont, Michel Gurfinkiel, Pierre Hassner, Jean-Vincent Holeindre, Pierre Kende, Annie Kriegel, Armand Laferrère, Guillaume Lagane, Mathieu Laine, Vincent Laloy, Alain Lancelot, Alain Laurent, Tristan Lecoq, Didier Maillard, Béatrice Majnoni d'Intignano, Sophie-Caroline de Margerie, Hervé Mariton, François de Mazières, Paul Mentré, Christophe Mercier, Thierry de Montbrial, Benoît Pellistrandi, Rémy Prud'Homme, Pierre Rigoulot, Hervé Robert, Giuseppe Sacco, Maryvonne de Saint-Pulgent, Dominique Schnapper, Antoine Schnapper, Mark Sherringham, Christine Sourgins, Éric Thiers, Françoise Thom, Nicolas Véron, Jean-Philippe Vincent,

See also
 Le Débat
 Esprit
 Études 
 Revue des deux Mondes

Notes

1978 establishments in France
Magazines established in 1978
Quarterly magazines published in France